Nandigram Upazila is an upazila of Bogra District in the Division of Rajshahi, Bangladesh. Nandigram Thana was established in 1932 and was converted into an upazila in 1983. It is named after its administrative center, the town of Nandigram.

Geography
It is bounded on the west by the Nagar River (across which lies Naogaon District). It borders Kahaloo and Shajahanpur upazilas to the north, Sherpur Upazila to the east, Natore District to the south and west, and Adamdighi Upazila to the west.

Demographics

According to the 2011 Bangladesh census, Nandigram Upazila had 45,853 households and a population of 180,802, 10.2% of whom lived in urban areas. 8.7% of the population was under the age of 5. The literacy rate (age 7 and over) was 47.5%, compared to the national average of 51.8%.

Administration
Nandigram Upazila is divided into Nandigram Municipality and five union parishads: Bhatgram, Bhatra, Burail, Nandigram, and Thalta Majhgram. The union parishads are subdivided into 192 mauzas and 228 villages.

Nandigram Municipality is subdivided into 9 wards and 22 mahallas.

Education

There are four colleges in the upazila. They include Hat Karai Degree College, Monsur Hossain Degree College, and Nandigram Mohilla College.and Nimaidighi adarsha college.

The madrasa education system includes four fazil madrasas and the Jamur Islamia Senior Alim Madrasah.

See also
Upazilas of Bangladesh
Districts of Bangladesh
Divisions of Bangladesh

References

Upazilas of Bogra District